The Master of Science in Respiratory Care (MSRC) is an advanced level postgraduate degree for respiratory therapists.  Few colleges and Universities currently offer this degree though an emphasis on its importance to respiratory care and research in pulmonary medicine is growing by both nursing groups and medical colleges.

Colleges of Respiratory Care
 Northeastern University (Boston, MA) (Online) - Master of Science in Respiratory Care Leadership
Concentrations in Adult and Organizational Learning, Clinical Trial Design, Health Management, and Respiratory Specialty Practice
 Georgia State University (Atlanta, GA) - Master of Science in Health Sciences, with a concentration in respiratory care.
 Loma Linda University (Loma Linda, CA) (Online) - Master of Science in Respiratory Care
 Accredited by WASC Senior College and University Commission (WSCUC)
 Rush University (Chicago, IL) - Master of Science in Respiratory Care
 University of Texas Health Science Center at San Antonio (San Antonio, TX) (Online)- Master of Science in Respiratory Care
 Accredited by the Commission on Accreditation for Respiratory Care (CoARC)
 University of Cincinnati (Cincinnati, OH) (Online) - Master of Science in Respiratory Care 
 Concentrations in Health Informatics, Health Care Administration, or Higher Education
 Accredited by the Higher Learning Commission
 University of North Carolina at Charlotte (Charlotte, NC) (Online) - Master of Science in Respiratory Care
 Provisional accreditation by CoARC
 Boise State University (Boise, Idaho) (Online) - Master of Science in Respiratory Care
 Accredited by the CoARC
 Texas State University (San Marcos, TX) (Online or Hybrid) - Master of Science in Respiratory Care
 Concentrations in Leadership and Polysommongraphy (Hybrid format only)
 Accredited through the Southern Association of Colleges and Schools. 
 Currently seeking accreditation through CoARC
 Bellarmine University (Louisville, KY) - Master of Health Science in Respiratory Care
 Provisional accreditation by CoARC
 Ohio State University (Columbus, OH) - Master of Respiratory Therapy
 Provisional accreditation by CoARC
 Weber State University (Ogden, UT) - Master of Science in Respiratory Therapy
 Concentrations in Health Administration Services, Education, Research
 Canisius (Buffalo, NY) (Online) - Master of Science in Respiratory Care
Concentrations in Respiratory Therapeutics or Respiratory Care Education
 Youngstown State University (Youngstown, OH) - Master of Respiratory Care
 University of Missouri (Columbia, MO) (Online) - Master of Health Science in Clinical and Diagnostic Science, with an emphasis in respiratory therapy
 Accredited by the Higher Learning Commission
 University of Mary (Bismarck, ND) - Master of Science in Respiratory Therapy

References

Respiratory therapy
Respiratory Care